Calum Cusiter (born 21 October 1980 in  Aberdeen, Scotland), is a retired Scottish 7s international  rugby union player formerly of Glasgow Warriors and Border Reivers. Cusiter played at Scrum-Half.  He is the elder brother of former Scotland captain Chris Cusiter.

Rugby Union career

Amateur career

Cusiter played for Boroughmuir at amateur level.

He also represented Edinburgh District when the Scottish Inter-District Championship returned to its amateur roots during the Scottish professional teams sojourn in the Welsh-Scottish League.

Professional career

In season 2005-06, Cusiter joined Glasgow Warriors on a trial. He played once that season for the Glasgow side, coming on as a substitute in the pre-season match against rivals Edinburgh Rugby. Edinburgh won the match 24 - 7.

In season 2006-07 Cusiter started with Glasgow Warriors. He played in Glasgow's match against the Scotland U20 team in November 2006.

He was shortly afterwards loaned out and played for Border Reivers at professional level for the rest of that season.

International career

Cusiter played for the Scotland Under 21 side in 1999.

He also played for the Scotland Club XV international side in 2006. He played for Scotland in the Club XV international match against Ireland.

Cusiter was called into the Scotland 7's squad in 2007, playing in both the New Zealand and USA legs of the series.

References

External links
Pro12 Player Profile
ESPN Calum Cusiter called up for Scotland 7s squad

1980 births
Living people
Border Reivers players
Boroughmuir RFC players
Edinburgh District (rugby union) players
Glasgow Warriors players
Male rugby sevens players
Scotland Club XV international rugby union players
Scotland international rugby sevens players
Scottish rugby union players